Anne Michel (born 30 October 1959) is a Belgian sprinter. She competed in the women's 400 metres at the 1980 Summer Olympics. She also shares in the 4 × 400 metres relay national record, set with Lea Alaerts, Regine Berg and Rosine Wallez at the 1980 Moscow Olympics.

References

External links
 

1959 births
Living people
Athletes (track and field) at the 1980 Summer Olympics
Belgian female sprinters
Olympic athletes of Belgium
Place of birth missing (living people)
Olympic female sprinters